Lyuben Stoychev Karavelov (c. 1834 – 21 January 1879) was a Bulgarian writer and an important figure of the Bulgarian National Revival.

Karavelov was born in Koprivshtitsa. He began his education in a church school, but in 1850 he moved to the school of Nayden Gerov in Plovdiv. He was then sent by his father to study in a Greek school for two years, before transferring to a Bulgarian school, where he also studied Russian literature. He moved to Odrin for an apprenticeship, but he soon came back to Koprivshtitsa and was sent to Constantinople in 1856. There he developed a strong interest in politics and the Crimean War. At the same time, he studied the culture and ethnography of the region.

In 1857, Karavelov enrolled in the Faculty of History and Philology at the University of Moscow, where he fell under the influence of Russian revolutionary democrats, was placed under police surveillance in 1859, and took part in student riots in 1861.  With a group of other young Bulgarian student radicals, he published a journal and started writing poetry and long short stories in Bulgarian, and scholarly publications on Bulgarian ethnography and journalism in Russian.  In 1867 he went to Belgrade as a correspondent for Russian newspapers and started publishing prose and journalism in Serbian. There he married Natalija Petrović, a Serbian activist and writer. In 1868 he was forced to move to Novi Sad, Austria-Hungary, because of his contacts with the Serb opposition (led by Svetozar Marković. Karavelov was arrested and spent time in a Budapest prison for alleged participation in a conspiracy. In 1869 he settled in Bucharest, intending to start his own newspaper and to cooperate with the newly founded Bulgarian Scholarly Society (the future Bulgarian Academy of Sciences).

At his first newspaper Svoboda (Freedom) in Bucharest (1869–1873), he worked and became friends with poet and revolutionary Hristo Botev who devoted a poem to him.  In 1870, Karavelov was elected chairman of the Bulgarian Revolutionary Central Committee, where he worked with Vasil Levski, the leader of the Internal Revolutionary Organization; he shared Levski's  ideas of a democratic republic as the goal of the national revolution.  Karavelov admired the political system of Switzerland (which he believed was a good model for the ethnically diverse Balkans) and the United States; he praised the American public education system, as well as the emancipated (in his opinion) status of American women.

In 1873–1874, Karavelov and Botev published a second newspaper, Nezavisimost (Independence).  Although Karavelov, the older of the two, was the recognized master, both of them were very good professional journalists, setting high standards for Bulgarian language and literature. (Sometimes it was hard to know who exactly authored the many unsigned materials.)  Following the capture and execution of Levski in 1873, though, the disheartened Karavelov gradually abandoned his revolutionary zeal, attracting Botev's severe criticism, and started publishing a new Znanie (Knowledge) journal and popular science books.

Karavelov died in Rousse in 1879, soon after the liberation of Bulgaria.

Karavelov's works include the short novels Old Time Bulgarians (and Mommy's Boy, considered among the first original Bulgarian novels.  His younger brother Petko was a prominent figure in Bulgaria's political life in the late nineteenth century.

Notes

References

External link

1830s births
1879 deaths
People from Koprivshtitsa
Bulgarian writers
Bulgarian revolutionaries
19th-century Bulgarian people
Bulgarian women's rights activists